Ivan Vahylevych, Jan Wagilewicz, (born 2 September 1811 in Yasen, today in Kingdom of Galicia and Lodomeria, Austrian Empire - died 10 May 1866 in Lviv, Kingdom of Galicia and Lodomeria) was Ukrainian Romantic poet, philologist, and ethnographer of the Galician revival in Western Ukraine.

Biography

While studying at University of Lviv and at the Greek Catholic Theological Seminary in Lviv, he associated with Markiyan Shashkevych and Yakiv Holovatsky, and the three of them formed the Ruthenian Triad. Vahylevych neglected his studies at the university frequently in order to make field trips to villages in western Ukraine, where he conducted archeological and ethnographic fieldwork. Because of his populist activities, cultural nationalist views, and correspondence with scholars in the Russian Empire, namely Mikhail Pogodin, Izmail Sreznevsky, and the Ukrainians Mykhailo Maksymovych and Osyp Bodiansky, he suffered harassment by the church and Austrian civil authorities. In 1846, he was ordained. He served as a pastor in Nestanychi for a while. During the Revolution of 1848–1849 in the Habsburg monarchy he supported a democratic Polish-Ukrainian political federation. Being a democratic Polish-Ukrainian political federation sympathizer, he took up the editorship of Dnewnyk Ruskij, the weekly run by the Ruthenian Congress.  Later that year he left the Ukrainian Greek Catholic Church in protest against the church hierarchy's sanctions against him and converted to Lutheranism. Ostracized by Catholic Ukrainians and by the Hierarchy of the Church, he was unable to find steady work until 1862, when he was appointed to the city archives in Lviv.

Literary works
During the period from 1829 to 1841, Vahylevych wrote poetry in Polish. He signed himself Jan Wagilewicz.

In 1836, he co-edited Rusalka Dnistrovaia, the first Galician Ukrainian almanac. He published articles on some bizarre, albeit popular, subjects like vampires and witches. He also authored important articles on the Hutsuls (1838–9) and the Boykos (1841), which were published in the journal of the Czech Museum in Prague.

See also
Ukrainian literature
Revolutions of 1848 in the Habsburg areas

References

External links 
Jan Wagilewicz: Grammatyka jezyka maloruskiego w Galicyi. Lwów 1845

1811 births
1866 deaths
People from Ivano-Frankivsk Oblast
Ukrainian Austro-Hungarians
Lutheran poets
People from the Kingdom of Galicia and Lodomeria
Ukrainian Protestants
Converts to Lutheranism from Roman Catholicism
Ukrainian philologists
Ukrainian poets
Ukrainian ethnographers
19th-century poets
19th-century Lutherans
Ukrainian writers in Polish